The 2001 Major League Soccer All-Star Game was the 6th Major League Soccer All-Star Game, played on July 28, 2001 at Spartan Stadium in San Jose, California. The game ended in a 6–6 tie. It is the only MLS All-Star Game that has ended in a tie (with no penalties or winner decided).

Match details 

|valign="top"|
|valign="top" style="width:50%"|

External links
MLS All-Star 2001 match report

MLS All-Star Game
All-Star Game
MLS All-Star
Sports competitions in San Jose, California
21st century in San Jose, California
July 2001 sports events in the United States